Delko was a French UCI ProTeam that was founded in 1974. They became a Continental team in 2011 allowing them to ride UCI Europe Tour races.  After financial difficulties, the team's operations were brought to a halt shortly before the end of the 2021 season.

Doping
In April 2018, news broke that Rémy Di Gregorio had failed an in-competition doping test for darbepoetin (EPO) during the 2018 edition of Paris–Nice.

Team roster

Major wins

National Champions
2013
 France U23 Time Trial, Yoann Paillot
2018
 Rwanda Time Trial, Joseph Areruya
 Bulgaria Road Race, Nikolay Mihaylov
2019
 Australia Criterium, Brenton Jones
 Rwanda Time Trial, Joseph Areruya
 Lithuania Road Race, Ramūnas Navardauskas
2020
 Lithuania Time Trial, Evaldas Šiškevičius
2021
 Lithuania Time Trial, Evaldas Šiškevičius
 Serbia Road Race Dušan Rajović

References

External links

UCI Professional Continental teams
Cycling teams based in France
Cycling teams established in 1974